Folly (SP-1453) was a sailing schooner that served in the United States Navy as a patrol vessel during World War I.

Folly served on section patrol duties in the 5th Naval District in a non-commissioned status during the period the United States participated in the war.

References

SP-1453 Folly at Department of the Navy Naval History and Heritage Command Online Library of Selected Images: U.S. Navy Ships: -- Listed by Hull Number: "SP" #s and "ID" #s -- World War I Era Patrol Vessels and other Acquired Ships and Craft numbered from SP-1400 through SP-1499
NavSource Online: Section Patrol Craft Photo Archive Folly (SP 1453)

Patrol vessels of the United States Navy
World War I patrol vessels of the United States
Schooners of the United States Navy
1884 ships